Stolby is a rural locality (a selo), the only inhabited locality, and the administrative center of Khatyryksky Rural Okrug of Namsky District in the Sakha Republic, Russia, located  from Namtsy, the administrative center of the district. Its population as of the 2010 Census was 1,084, of whom 542 were male and 542 female, up from 960 as recorded during the 2002 Census.

References

Notes

Sources
Official website of the Sakha Republic. Registry of the Administrative-Territorial Divisions of the Sakha Republic. Namsky District. 

Rural localities in Namsky District